Christian F. Kruzinski (September 4, 1956 – May 7, 1993), better known also as Cee Farrow, was a new wave singer of the early 1980s.

Background
Farrow was born in Frankfurt, Germany. Originally a model, he was most noted for his debut single "Should I Love You", which peaked at no. 82 on the Billboard Hot 100 on October 22, 1983. The single also entered the R&B Singles chart on October 8, 1983 and peaked at no. 91. He released one full-length LP, titled Red and Blue, on the Rocshire label in 1983. The label suffered legal problems and all its assets, including master tapes, were seized. The album never has been officially re-issued on CD.

Farrow also designed over a dozen album covers for Rochshire and Graphite Records' artists, including his own debut album, the 1983 album The Boy Is Mine by Caro, and the 1984 album Stage Struck by Justine Johns.

In August 1984 he married April M Gabrielle (April M. Kruzinski) in Nevada.
During the late 1980s and early 1990s, Farrow and April ran a series of nightclubs in the Los Angeles area. Among these were The Apartment Club (1988–90), The Bitter End (1985) and Maxx.

Farrow re-surfaced with another single "Imagination" in 1991 under the label Graphite Records, although it failed to gain any success. A music video was created for the single.

Farrow died on May 7, 1993 in West Hollywood, California, reportedly of a brain disease attributed to AIDS. He was cremated and his funeral was held at Greystone Manor in Los Angeles.

Discography

Albums
1983: Red and Blue

Singles
1983: "Should I Love You" (Billboard Hot 100 No. 82, Hot R&B Songs No. 91)
1983: "Don't Ask Why"
1983: "Wildlife Romance" (Released as promotional 12" vinyl only)
1991: "Imagination"

References 

Billboard Magazine, October 22, 1983

External links 
 Allmusic.com
 Timesunion.com, October 27, 2009, Chuck Miller, "The Rise and Fall of Rocshire Records and the Loss of Stacy Davis"

Discogs page

1956 births
1993 deaths
German new wave musicians
American LGBT musicians
AIDS-related deaths in California
20th-century American musicians
20th-century German musicians
20th-century German LGBT people